Eliza (Buckminster) Lee (1792–1864) was an American author, the daughter of Joseph Buckminster.  She was born in Portsmouth, New Hampshire;  was educated by her father and brother, Joseph Stevens Buckminster;  married a Thomas Lee of Boston; became a writer;  and was felicitous in her descriptions of New England life.  She wrote, notably:  Sketches of New England Life (1837);  Naomi, or Boston Two Hundred Years Ago (1848);  and memoirs of her father and brother (1849).  She translated from the German, wrote a life of Jean Paul (1842),  and published an historical novel,  Parthenia, the Last Days of Paganism (1858).

References

External links

American biographers
German–English translators
19th-century American memoirists
Writers from Portsmouth, New Hampshire
1792 births
1864 deaths
19th-century American translators
19th-century American women writers
American women memoirists